Meritxell Batet Lamaña (born 19 March 1973) is a Spanish jurist and politician member of the Socialists' Party of Catalonia, currently serving as President of the Congress of Deputies. Prior to this, she served as Minister for Territorial Policy and Civil Service of the Government of Spain between June 2018 and May 2019.

A professor of Constitutional Law at the Pompeu Fabra University, she has been a member of the Socialist Parliamentary Group in the 8th, 9th, 10th, 11th, 12th, 13th and 14th terms of the lower house.

Early years and academic career 
Batet studied at the Gravi School in Barcelona and joined the university with the support of scholarships. In 1995 she graduated in Law from the Pompeu Fabra University where also took doctorate courses with the presentation of the thesis Participation, deliberation and transparency in the institutions and bodies of the European Union. In 1998 she completed a postgraduate course in real estate and urban development law at IDEC. In 2013 presented the doctoral thesis project entitled The principle of subsidiarity in Spain.

From 1995 to 1998 she was professor of Administrative Law at Pompeu Fabra University and was a professor of Constitutional Law until her appointment as Minister in 2018. In 2007 received a German Marshall scholarship to maintain a stay in the United States.

Member of the Congress of Deputies 
Her first contact with politics was during her student years. She explained in different interviews that when she received a grant from the Generalitat to study the doctorate at the university, her thesis supervisor, Josep Mir, told her that Narcís Serra, then first secretary of the PSC, was looking for someone to coordinate his secretariat who was not a militant. Batet collaborated with him for two years. From 2001 to 2004 she directed the Carles Pi i Sunyer Foundation for Autonomous and Local Studies.

In 2004, she was an independent in the ninth position on the Barcelona list of the Socialist Party of Catalonia for the Congress of Deputies headed by José Montilla and was elected member of parliament for Barcelona. In 2008 she joined the PSC where she works in the group of Gràcia of the Federation of Barcelona.

In the legislative elections of 2008 occupied the eleventh position of the list for Barcelona and renewed her seat as in the legislative elections of 2011 to which it concurred in the position number eight.

In February 2013 she broke the voting discipline of the Socialist Group together with other members of the PSC by voting in the Congress of Deputies in favor of the two initiatives presented by CiU and La Izquierda Plural (IU-ICV / EUiA-CHA) to allow the carrying out a referendum in Catalonia on its future relationship with the rest of Spain. The socialist group fined undisciplined deputies with 600 euros.

In July 2014, she was appointed Secretary of Studies and Programs in the Federal Executive Commission of the PSOE, assuming her first organic position.

In the legislative elections of 2015, she was number two on the PSOE list for Madrid despite being a PSC militant in tandem with Secretary-General Pedro Sánchez. In addition to coordinating the electoral program for the elections, Sánchez entrusted her with the coordination of the team of experts that outlines its proposal for reforming the Constitution.

In February 2016, she was one of the people chosen by Sánchez to negotiate with other political forces in an attempt to set up an alternative government alliance to PP.

In April 2016, she agreed to head the PSC's list for Barcelona in the general election convened for the month of June, following the resignation of Carme Chacón to become a candidate again. In May 2016, it was confirmed that Batet would be a candidate without primaries after the resignation of Carles Martí to propose an alternative candidacy. She was one of the 15 PSOE-PSC deputies to vote against the investiture of Mariano Rajoy following the elections.

Minister for Territorial Policy and Civil Service 
In June 2018, following the motion of censure that the PSOE presented against the previous government of Mariano Rajoy (PP) and that was approved by the Congress of Deputies on June 1, new Spanish Prime Minister, Pedro Sánchez, appointed her as Minister in new Spanish government.

Felipe VI formally appointed her by royal decree on June 6 as holder of the portfolio of Minister for Territorial Policy and Civil Service. On 7 June she took office as Minister before the King at Palace of Zarzuela. At the request of the Prime Minister and to focus solely on government work, Batet resigned to her seat in parliament after more than 14 years of service on June 15.

She stepped down on May 20, 2019 in order to become head of the Congress of Deputies.

President of the Congress of Deputies 
Batet was elected Member of the Congress of Deputies again in the April 2019 general election. On May 17, 2019, the Socialist Party, winner of the general election, announced that would present Batet as the candidate of the party to be the next speaker of the lower house.

The Cortes Generales opening sessions were held on May 21 and, as expected, Batet was elected Speaker. Batet was elected thanks to the support of her party, the far-left Unidas Podemos and other minority parties such as Basque Nationalist Party, Compromís, Canarian Coalition and the Regionalist Party of Cantabria.

The 13th Cortes Generales were disbanded on September 24, 2019 due to the impossibility of forming a government. Batet was re-elected on the November 2019 general election and the Socialist Party presented her as its candidate to Speaker of the House. She received the trust of the lower house again in December 2019, being re-elected as head of the Congress of Deputies.

Personal life 
In August 2005 she married, in the Cantabrian town of Santillana del Mar, a member of parliament for Cantabria of the People's Party, José María Lassalle, with whom she has two twin daughters. They divorced ten years later, in May 2016. Lassalle was appointed by PM Mariano Rajoy State Secretary for Culture, and later, in 2016, Society of Information and the Digital Agenda of Spain.

Batet tested positive for COVID-19 on 27 December 2021 during the pandemic in Spain.

Publications 
E. Niubó, M. Batet, J. Majó , Europa, Federalisme, Socialdemocràcia XXI, Fundació Rafael Campalans, Barcelona, 2012.
L’esperança cívica d’Europa. Reflexions sobre el paper de la ciutadania a partir de la nova Constitució Europea. Publicado en FRC Revista de Debat Polític, primavera 10, 2005.
Indicadores de gestión de servicios públicos locales. Document Pi i Sunyer número 25, Fundació Carles Pi i Sunyer, Barcelona 2004
Indicadors de gestió de serveis públics locals: una iniciativa des de Catalunya. En Evaluación y control de políticas públicas. Indicadores de gestión. Ayuntamiento de Gijón, 2002

References

|-

1973 births
21st-century Spanish women politicians
Academics from Catalonia
Jurists from Catalonia
Women politicians from Catalonia
Government ministers of Spain
Living people
Members of the 8th Congress of Deputies (Spain)
Members of the 9th Congress of Deputies (Spain)
Members of the 10th Congress of Deputies (Spain)
Members of the 11th Congress of Deputies (Spain)
Members of the 12th Congress of Deputies (Spain)
Members of the 13th Congress of Deputies (Spain)
Pompeu Fabra University alumni
Presidents of the Congress of Deputies (Spain)
Socialists' Party of Catalonia politicians
Academic staff of Pompeu Fabra University
Spanish jurists
Spanish Socialist Workers' Party politicians
Women government ministers of Spain
Women legislative speakers
Women members of the Congress of Deputies (Spain)
Members of the 14th Congress of Deputies (Spain)